Losse is a river of Hesse, Germany. It is a right tributary of the Fulda, which it joins in Kassel. It flows through Hessisch Lichtenau and Kaufungen.

See also
List of rivers of Hesse

References

Rivers of Hesse
North Hesse
Rivers of Germany